HMS Obdurate was an O-class destroyer of the Royal Navy. She was built by William Denny and Brothers of Dumbarton, being laid down at their yards on the River Clyde on 25 April 1940, launched on 19 February 1942 and commissioned on 3 September 1942.

Service history

Second World War

During the Second World War she escorted Arctic convoys in 1942 and 1944, and Atlantic convoys in 1943, taking part in the Battle of the Barents Sea in 1942.

In December 1942, while on escort for convoy JW 51B, she was attacked and damaged by the German heavy cruiser .

At the end of the war, she escorted the cruiser  whilst the latter took King Haakon VII back to Norway, followed by post-war work in German waters. On 14 July 1945 US president Harry Truman transferred to Obdurate from the cruiser  in the English Channel to travel the rest of his journey to the Potsdam Conference.

Postwar service
After the war Obdurate was used for torpedo training at Portsmouth. In 1948 she was placed into reserve at HMNB Portsmouth before a refit on the Tyne 1949 and 1950. She was then held in reserve at Chatham Dockyard between 1950 and 1952. Between 1952 and 1956 she was part of the Nore local squadron. In 1953 she took part in the Fleet Review to celebrate the Coronation of Queen Elizabeth II.

Between 1957 and 1959 she was again held in reserve at Portsmouth. In 1959 she was used in tests by the NCRE at Rosyth. She was sold for scrap in 1964, arriving at Inverkeithing on 30 November of that year for breaking.

Notes

References

External links
 http://www.roll-of-honour.com/Ships/HMSObdurate.html
 http://www.naval-history.net/xGM-Chrono-10DD-47O-Obdurate.htm
 https://web.archive.org/web/20110726152140/http://www.hmsgangestoterror.org/obdurate/HMSObdurate.htm

 

O and P-class destroyers
Ships built on the River Clyde
1942 ships
World War II destroyers of the United Kingdom